is the major railway station in the town of Kawatana, Nagasaki Prefecture, Japan. It is operated by JR Kyushu and is on the Ōmura Line.

Lines
Besides the local services on the line, the Rapid Seaside Liner also stops at the station.

Station layout 
The station consists of two platforms serving two tracks. The platforms and tracks are not opposed. Platform/track 2 is actually on the far side of what was once an island platform with the centre line removed. A siding runs beside track 2. The station building is a steel frame structure of modern design and houses a waiting room and staffed ticket window. A ramp leads up to the station building from the forecourt. Access to the opposite site platform is by means of a level crossing with ramps at both ends. A footbridge allows pedestrians to cross from one side of the tracks to the other. Parking for cars is available both at the station forecourt and on the other side of the tracks.

Management of the station has been outsourced to the JR Kyushu Tetsudou Eigyou Co., a wholly owned subsidiary of JR Kyushu specialising in station services. It staffs the ticket window which is equipped with a POS machine but does not have a Midori no Madoguchi facility.

Platforms

Adjacent stations

Environs
National Route 205
Saihi bus Kawatana Bus Station 
Kawatana post office
Kawatana police office
Kawatana River
New-Crein hotel
Kawatana public office
Nagasaki Kawatana Medical Center

History
By 1897, the track had reached . In the next phase of expansion, the track was extended towards  which opened as the new terminus on 20 January 1898. Kawatana was opened on the same day as an intermediate station between Haiki and Ōmura. When the Kyushu Railway was nationalized on 1 July 1907, Japanese Government Railways (JGR) took over control of the station. On 12 October 1909, track from Tosu through Haiki to Nagasaki was designated the Nagasaki Main Line. With the privatization of Japanese National Railways (JNR), the successor of JGR, on 1 April 1987, control of the station passed to JR Kyushu.

Passenger statistics
In fiscal 2016, the station was used by an average of 921 passengers daily (boarding passengers only), and it ranked 174th  among the busiest stations of JR Kyushu.

See also
 List of railway stations in Japan

References

External links
Kawatana Station (JR Kyushu)

Railway stations in Nagasaki Prefecture
Railway stations in Japan opened in 1898
Ōmura Line